Drudi is a surname. Notable people with the surname include:

Dario Hernan Drudi (born 1987), Argentine football manager
Mirko Drudi (born 1987), Italian footballer